Deliciousness is an American comedy clip show that premiered on December 14, 2020. It is hosted by Tiffani Thiessen and co-hosted by Angela Kinsey, Kel Mitchell and Tim Chantarangsu. The series is a spin off of Ridiculousness and showcases various food-themed videos from the Internet.

In February 2021, the series was renewed for a second season, and in December for a third.

Episodes

Series overview

Season 1 (2020)

Season 2 (2021)

Season 3 (2022)

Broadcast
The series premiered on December 14, 2020. The series aired for a brief time on Viacom owned networks, including Comedy Central, Pop, CMT and MTV2. The series airs from 7:00 to 7:30 PM (EST) on MTV.

References

External links
 Deliciousness at IMDb

MTV original programming
2020s American comedy television series
2020s American video clip television series
2020 American television series debuts
American television spin-offs
Food and drink television series
Mass media about Internet culture
Television series about social media
Internet memes